Ain Dara, is a village about  from Beirut, in the governorate of Mount Lebanon, in the Aley District.
It had 3,874 registered voters in 2010. Originally a Druze village, Ain Dara today is a mixed Druze and Christian village, with a Christian majority, as per the recent registered voters.

It is close to Mount Barouk, which is famous for its cedar forest. Its altitude gives it cool summers and cold winters with heavy snowfall.

Some well-known places surrounding Ain Dara are Hammana and Mdeirej to the north, Aghmeed and Bmahray to the south, Dahr-el-Baydar to the east and Saoufar to the west. Ain Dara is known for the famous Battle of Ain Dara that took place in 1711 between the two parties of the time; the Qaysis and the Yemenis, resulting in a total Qaysi victory under the leadership of Emir Haidar Chehab; a victory that decisively established the Chehabi rule for the next 150 years.

Places of worship

 Druze Khalwat: Khalwat Zeitouni, Atallah 

Ain Dara also contains five churches :
 Saint George (gerges) Maronite Church (The oldest church in the village 1890 AD)
 Saint Mary (al saydeh) Maronite Church
 Saint George (gawergios) Orthodox Church, Father Ghassan Haddad.
 Saint Elie (elias) Orthodox Church, Father Ghassan Haddad
 Church of the Assumption, Orthodox Church, Father Ghassan Haddad
 Aindara Evangelical Baptist Church.

Nature and cultural attractions
Natural and Cultural Attractions are:
 El-Okeili Historical Square
 Ancient Churches: Mar Gerges - Maronite Church, Mar Gerges Orthodox Church
 Druze hermitage site: Makam Shaykh Badereddin El Enderi (The first Shaykh Akl of the Druze)
 Qoubat Al-Sitt
 Ancient village of Tayroush
 Natural water sources: Ain Barakeh, Ain Al Tarcha, Ain Majed, Ain Al-Kakbi, Ain Al-Tamam, Hafr Al Tannour, Bahsasa, Ain Al Bustan, Ain Al Hammam, Ain Al Wosta
 Al Dayaa Grottos
 Pine Forest

Families
Families of Ain Dara include: 
Atallah, Bader, Bou Faissal, Faisal, Haddad, Haidamous, Wehbeh, Yammine, Yehia, Zakharia, Zeitouni.

Additional information
Ain Dara has 3 schools:
-  1 public  and 2 private.
There are no hospitals in Ain Dara.

External links
Ain Dara, localiban

Populated places in Aley District
Druze communities in Lebanon
Eastern Orthodox Christian communities in Lebanon
Maronite Christian communities in Lebanon